Suresh Kumar and Ranjith Kumar were  minority Sri Lankan Tamils working for the Uthayan – a Tamil newspaper published from Jaffna. Uthayan has been specifically targeted for its independent reporting by the Sri Lankan military and the paramilitary group EPDP. They were killed on 2 May 2006 during an attack on the Uthayan office.

Background 
In Jaffna – which is under Sri Lankan army control – journalists, human rights activists and civilians have lived under constant fear. These killing are part of series of killing, abduction and attacks on the Tamil Media in Sri Lanka. These killings, abductions and threats are seen as part of the dirty war launched by Mahinda Rajapaksa government.

Incident and reaction 
Suresh Kumar and Ranjith Kumar were killed after a Uthayan published a cartoon mocking Douglas Devananda the leader of EPDP a paramilitary group allied with the Sri Lankan Army. Armed Gunmen entered the office of Uthayan in army controlled Jaffna on 2 May 2006 and demanded to see the editor R. Kuhanathan and finding he was not there opened fire and the two employees died instantly.

References

Kumar
Deaths by firearm in Sri Lanka
Assassinated Sri Lankan journalists
Sri Lankan Tamil journalists
Assassinated Sri Lankan activists
People murdered in Sri Lanka
Year of birth missing